Frances Mayes is an American novelist. Her 1996 memoir Under the Tuscan Sun. was on the New York Times Best Seller list for over two years and was the basis for the film Under the Tuscan Sun.

Biography
Born and raised in Fitzgerald, Georgia, Mayes attended Randolph-Macon Woman's College in Lynchburg, Virginia, and obtained her BA from the University of Florida. In 1975 she earned her MA from San Francisco State University, where she eventually became Professor of Creative Writing, director of The Poetry Center, and chair of the Department of Creative Writing.

Mayes has published several works of poetry: Climbing Aconcagua (1977), Sunday in Another Country (1977), After Such Pleasures (1979), The Arts of Fire (1982), Hours (1984), and Ex Voto (1995). In 1996 she published the book Under the Tuscan Sun: At Home in Italy, which was on the New York Times Best Seller list for over two years.  The book is a memoir of Mayes buying, renovating, and living in an abandoned villa in rural Cortona in Tuscany, a region of Italy. A film loosely based on the book, Under the Tuscan Sun. was released in 2003, adapted by director Audrey Wells. In 1999, Bella Tuscany: The Sweet Life in Italy was published, and in 2000, In Tuscany. Mayes's first novel, Swan, was published in 2002. The book Bringing Tuscany Home was published in 2004, a collaborative effort of Mayes and her husband Edward Kleinschmidt Mayes with photographer Steven Rothfeld.  Another memoir, Every Day in Tuscany, was released in March 2010.

Also a food-and-travel writer, Mayes is the editor of The Best American Travel Writing 2002 and the author of A Year in the World: Journeys of A Passionate Traveller (2006), narratives of her and her husband's travels in Greece, Turkey, Spain, Morocco and other countries.

Now writing full-time, she and her husband, a poet, divide their time between homes in Hillsborough, North Carolina and Cortona, Italy, where she serves as the artistic director of the annual Tuscan Sun Festival.

Books 
 Sunday in Another Country
 Hours
 After Such Pleasures
 The Discovery of Poetry: A Field Guide to Reading and Writing
 Ex Voto
 Under the Tuscan Sun
 Bella Tuscany
 A Year in the World: Journeys of A Passionate Traveller
 Every Day in Tuscany
 In Tuscany
 Bringing Tuscany Home: Sensuous Style from the Heart of Italy (with Edward Mayes and Steven Rothfeld)
 The Tuscan Sun Cookbook: Recipes from My Italian Kitchen
 Under Magnolia: A Southern Memoir
 Swan
 The Arts of Fire
 The Book of Summer
 Shrines: Images of Italian Worship (with Steven Rothfeld)
 Women in Sunlight
 See You in the Piazza

References

External links
 Frances Mayes website
 

1940 births
Living people
People from Fitzgerald, Georgia
21st-century American novelists
American women novelists
Novelists from Georgia (U.S. state)
People from Hillsborough, North Carolina
American women poets
American women essayists
21st-century American women writers
21st-century American poets
21st-century American essayists
University of Florida alumni
Randolph College alumni
San Francisco State University alumni
San Francisco State University faculty
American women travel writers
American travel writers